Verkė is a small (around 2 km. long) rivulet in Vilnius, Lithuania, which gave the name to the Verkiai neighborhood. According to legends, it was the birthplace of the semi-legendary pagan priest Lizdeika, a forefather of the Radziwiłł family.

References

Rivers of Lithuania